Route 4, or Highway 4, may refer to several highways in the following countries:

International
 Asian Highway 4
 European route E04 
 European route E004
 Cairo – Cape Town Highway

Albania
 SH-4 road in Albania from Durres to Kakavija passing through Lushnje, Fier, Ballsh, Tepelene and Gjirokastër.

Australia

New South Wales 
 M4 Western Motorway (Sydney)
 Western Distributor (Sydney)

Northern Territory 
 Lasseter Highway, NT
 
 Tjukaruru Road
 Great Central Road

Queensland 
 Port of Brisbane Motorway
 Capricorn Highway
 Scenic Highway, Queensland

Tasmania 
 Esk Highway, Tasmania

Western Australia 
 State Route 4 (Western Australia) – Tonkin Highway

Austria
 Ost Autobahn

Belgium
R4 road (Belgium)

Bulgaria
 A4 motorway (Bulgaria)
 I-4 road (Bulgaria)

Burma
National Highway 4 (Burma)

Cambodia
National Highway 4 (Cambodia)

Canada
 Alberta Highway 4
 British Columbia Highway 4
 Manitoba Highway 4
 New Brunswick Route 4
 Northwest Territories Highway 4 (Ingraham Trail)
 Nova Scotia Trunk 4
 Ontario Highway 4
 Route 4 (Prince Edward Island)
 Quebec Route 4 (former)
 Saskatchewan Highway 4
 Yukon Highway 4

China
  G4 Expressway
 G4w Expressway (G4's branch)

Costa Rica
 National Route 4

Czech Republic
 D4 Motorway
 I/4 Highway (in Czech)

Djibouti
  RN-4 (Djibouti)

Dominican Republic
  DR-4

Finland
 Finnish national road 4
 Åland Islands Highway 4

Germany
 Bundesautobahn 4

Hong Kong
 Route 4 (Hong Kong)

Hungary
 M4 motorway (Hungary)
 Main road 4 (Hungary)

India
  National Highway 4 (India)
  National Highway 4 (India, old numbering)

Indonesia
 Indonesian National Route 4

Iraq
 Highway 4 (Iraq)

Ireland
 M4 motorway (Republic of Ireland)
 N4 road (Ireland)

Israel
 Highway 4 (Israel)

Italy
 Autostrada A4
 RA 4
 State road 4
 T4

Japan

 (branch of the Tōhoku Expressway)
 (branch of the Tōhoku Expressway)
 (branch of the Tōhoku Expressway)
 (branch of the Tōhoku Expressway)
 (branch of the Tōhoku Expressway)
 (branch of the Tōhoku Expressway)
 Route 4 (Shuto Expressway)
 Route 4 (Nagoya Expressway)
 Bayshore Route (Port of Osaka-Kansai International Airport)

Korea, South
 National Route 4

Malaysia
 Malaysia Federal Route 4

Moldova
 M4 highway (Moldova)

Netherlands
 Rijksweg 4

New Zealand
 New Zealand State Highway 4

Nicaragua
 Nicaraguan Highway 4

Norway 
 Norwegian National Road 4

Paraguay
 National Route 4

Philippines
 Circumferential Road 4
 Radial Road 4
 N4 highway (Philippines)
 E4 expressway (Philippines)

Poland 
  Motorway A4 
  National road 4 (according to the official documents, national road 4 and motorway A4 are basically the same route)

Romania
 Drumul Naţional 4
 A4 motorway (Romania)

Russia
 M4 highway (Russia)

South Africa
 M4 (Port Elizabeth)
 M4 road (Pretoria)
 M4 (Durban)

Taiwan
 National Highway 4 (Taiwan)
 Provincial Highway 4 (Taiwan)

Thailand
  Thailand Route 4 (Phetkasem Road)

Turkey
  , a motorway in Turkey running from Istanbul to Ankara.

United Kingdom
 M4 motorway (Great Britain)
 A4 road (Great Britain)
 A4 road (Northern Ireland)

United States
 Interstate 4
 Interstate A-4 (Alaska; unsigned)
 Interstate H-4 (former proposal)
 U.S. Route 4
 New England Interstate Route 4 (former)
 Alabama State Route 4 (former)
 Alaska Route 4
 Arkansas Highway 4
 California State Route 4
 Connecticut Route 4
 Delaware Route 4
 Florida State Road 4
 County Road 4 (Escambia County, Florida)
 County Road 4A (Escambia County, Florida)
 County Road 4 (Okaloosa County, Florida)
 County Road 4B (Okaloosa County, Florida)
 Georgia State Route 4
 Georgia State Route 4 (former)
 Idaho State Highway 4
 Illinois Route 4
 Indiana State Road 4
 Iowa Highway 4
 K-4 (Kansas highway)
 Kentucky Route 4
 Louisiana Highway 4
 Maine State Route 4
 Maryland Route 4
 Massachusetts Route 4
 M-4 (Michigan highway) (former)
 Minnesota State Highway 4 (former)
 County Road 4 (Dakota County, Minnesota)
 County Road 4 (Goodhue County, Minnesota)
 County Road 4 (St. Louis County, Minnesota)
 Mississippi Highway 4
 Missouri Route 4 (former)
 Nebraska Highway 4
 Nevada State Route 4 (former)
 New Hampshire Route 4
 New Jersey Route 4
 New Jersey Route 4N (former)
 County Route 4 (Monmouth County, New Jersey)
 County Route 4A (Monmouth County, New Jersey)
 New Mexico State Road 4
New York State Route 4 (1924–1927) (former)
 County Route 4 (Broome County, New York)
 County Route 4 (Cattaraugus County, New York)
 County Route 4 (Chautauqua County, New York)
 County Route 4 (Chemung County, New York)
 County Route 4 (Chenango County, New York)
 County Route 4 (Clinton County, New York)
 County Route 4 (Columbia County, New York)
 County Route 4 (Dutchess County, New York)
 County Route 4 (Erie County, New York)
 County Route 4 (Franklin County, New York)
 County Route 4 (Genesee County, New York)
 County Route 4 (Jefferson County, New York)
 County Route 4 (Nassau County, New York)
 County Route 4 (Oswego County, New York)
 County Route 4 (Otsego County, New York)
 County Route 4 (Rensselaer County, New York)
 County Route 4 (Rockland County, New York)
 County Route 4 (Saratoga County, New York)
 County Route 4 (Steuben County, New York)
 County Route 4 (Suffolk County, New York)
 County Route 4 (Tioga County, New York)
 County Route 4 (Ulster County, New York)
 County Route 4 (Warren County, New York)
 County Route 4 (Wyoming County, New York)
 North Carolina Highway 4
 Charlotte Route 4
 North Dakota Highway 4
 Ohio State Route 4
 Oklahoma State Highway 4
 Pennsylvania Route 4 (former)
 Rhode Island Route 4
 South Carolina Highway 4
 Tennessee State Route 4
 Texas State Highway 4
 Texas State Highway Loop 4 (former)
 Texas Farm to Market Road 4
 Texas Park Road 4
 Texas Recreational Road 4
Either of two prior designations for highways in Utah
 Utah State Route 4 (1962-1977), the former designation for Interstate 70 in Utah
 Utah State Route 4 (1910-1962), the state designation for several sections of multiple U.S. Highways in the northern part of the state
 Vermont Route 4A
 Virginia State Route 4
 Washington State Route 4
 Primary State Highway 4 (Washington) (former)
 West Virginia Route 4

Territories
 Guam Highway 4
Puerto Rico Highway 4 (former)

Uruguay
  Route 4 Andrés Artigas

See also